Burney Peak is a peak rising west of Duthoit Point in the eastern part of Nelson Island, in the South Shetland Islands. It was named by the UK Antarctic Place-Names Committee in 1961 for Captain Burney, Master of the British sealing vessel Nelson, probably from London, who visited the South Shetland Islands in 1820–23.

References
 SCAR Composite Antarctic Gazetteer.
 

Mountains of the South Shetland Islands